Jason Crafton (born January 30, 1982) is an American basketball coach. He's the current head coach of the Maryland Eastern Shore Hawks men's basketball.

Playing career
Crafton played college basketball at Nyack College, where he was named team captain his junior and senior seasons. He was also a member of the schools only CACC Championship Team in the 1999-200 season.

Coaching career
After graduation, Crafton joined Jay Wright's staff at Villanova as a video coordinator for two seasons until 2005, when he accepted an assistant coaching position at Navy where he'd serve under fellow former Villanova staffer Billy Lange as well as a season under Ed DeChellis. Crafton would return to Nyack to become the school's head men's basketball coach where from 2012–2018 he compiled a 47–108 record before accepting an assistant coaching position with the Delaware Blue Coats of the NBA G League.

On April 24, Crafton was named the head coach at Maryland Eastern Shore.

Head coaching record

NCAA DII

NCAA DI

References

1982 births
Living people
American men's basketball coaches
American men's basketball players
College men's basketball players in the United States
Delaware Blue Coats coaches
Maryland Eastern Shore Hawks men's basketball coaches
Navy Midshipmen men's basketball coaches
Nyack College alumni
Nyack Warriors men's basketball coaches